Diego de Muros (also Diego de Moiras) (1405–1492) was a Roman Catholic prelate who served as Bishop of Ciudad Rodrigo (1487–1492) and Bishop of Tui (1472–1487). He was one of three bishops of Spain of the same name who served contemporaneously, the others being Diego de Muros (Bishop of Islas Canarias) and Diego de Muros (bishop of Oviedo).

Biography
Diego de Muros was born in Muros, A Coruña, Spain and ordained a priest in the Order of the Blessed Virgin Mary of Mercy.
On 15 June 1472, he was appointed during the papacy of Pope Sixtus IV as Bishop of Tui. On 31 January 1473, he was consecrated bishop by Šimun Vosić, Archbishop of Bar, with Deodato Bocconi, Bishop of Ajaccio, and Giovanni Andrea de Bussi, Bishop of Aleria, serving as co-consecrators. On 1 June 1487, he was appointed during the papacy of Pope Innocent VIII as Bishop of Ciudad Rodrigo. He served as Bishop of Ciudad Rodrigo until his death in 1492.

See also 
Diego de Muros (Bishop of Islas Canarias)
Diego de Muros (bishop of Oviedo)

References

External links and additional sources
 (for Chronology of Bishops) 
 (for Chronology of Bishops) 
 (for Chronology of Bishops) 
 (for Chronology of Bishops) 

15th-century Roman Catholic bishops in Castile
Bishops appointed by Pope Sixtus IV
Bishops appointed by Pope Innocent VIII
1405 births
1492 deaths
People from the Province of A Coruña
Mercedarian bishops